Petuelring is an U-Bahn station in Munich on the U3. It was opened on 8 May 1972. It is also the northern terminus of route  of the Munich tramway.

References

Munich U-Bahn stations
Railway stations in Germany opened in 1972
Buildings and structures completed in 1972
1972 establishments in West Germany